Sapria poilanei is a holoparasitic flowering plant endemic to Cambodia.

H. Bänziger & B. Hansen (1997) consider specimens in Thailand formerly identified as Sapria poilanei to be Sapria ram.

References

Cambodian Journal of Natural History Volume 2010 Issue 1

Endemic flora of Cambodia
Parasitic plants
Rafflesiaceae